Lucius Tillius Cimber (died 42 BC) was a Roman senator. He was one of the assassins of Julius Caesar, creating the diversion that enabled the conspirators to attack.

Assassin
Cimber was initially one of Caesar's strongest supporters. Caesar granted Cimber governorship of the provinces of Bithynia and Pontus in 44 BC. He may also have been Praetor in the same year. Cicero once used Cimber's influence on Caesar to help a friend.

It is not known why he joined the assassination, but Seneca states that he was motivated by ambition. His role was to set the stage for the attack by presenting to Caesar a petition to recall Cimber's exiled brother Publius. Plutarch states that other assassins then pretended to add their own petitions to Cimber's. According to Suetonius, Caesar gestured him away, but Cimber grabbed hold of him by the shoulders and pulled down Caesar's tunic. Caesar then cried to Cimber "Why, this is violence!" ("Ista quidem vis est!").  At the same time, Servilius Casca produced his dagger and made a glancing thrust at the dictator's neck but instead hit his shoulder. The other assassins then joined in.

After Caesar's death, Cimber left for Bithynia to raise a fleet in support of the leaders of the assassins, Marcus Brutus and Gaius Cassius Longinus. According to the pseudo-Brutus letters (purporting to be letters between Brutus and Cicero), he defeated Publius Cornelius Dolabella and provided naval support to Brutus and Cassius's invasion of Macedonia. He is last heard of shortly before the Battle of Philippi and is assumed to have been killed during the campaign.

According to Seneca, Cimber was a bold active man but was a heavy drinker and prone to violence.

In literature
Cimber may have been the inspiration for the character Tillius in Horace's Satires, who epitomises raw ambition. He appears as a minor character in Shakespeare's play Julius Caesar (1599), in which his name is given as "Metellus Cimber."  In the 1953 version, Cimber was played by veteran character actor Tom Powers.

References

External links
Dictionary of Greek and Roman Biography and Mythology

Senators of the Roman Republic
Assassins of Julius Caesar
42 BC deaths
Year of birth unknown